The Segre ( or) is a river tributary to the Ebro (Ebre in Catalan) with a basin comprising territories across three states: France, Andorra and Spain.

The river Segre, known to Romans and Greeks as Sicoris, and to the Arabs of Al-Andalus as Nahr az-Zaytūn (نهر الزيتون, river of Olives)  has its sources on the north face of the Pic del Segre or Puigmal de Segre ("Segre's Peak") in the French department Pyrénées-Orientales (historically the comarca of Alta Cerdanya), in the Catalan Pyrenees. It follows a western direction all along the Cerdanya (Cerdagne) Valley, and crosses the town Saillagouse, the Spanish exclave Llívia and Bourg-Madame.

It enters Spain at Puigcerdà and continues west until La Seu d'Urgell, where it meets the Valira River coming from Andorra. From this point it adopts a south-western course across the pre-Pyrenees (with several dams along its gorges) and the western plains of Catalonia. It passes through Balaguer, Lleida and flows into the Ebro at Mequinenza.

Among its tributaries: Valira (from Andorra), Noguera Pallaresa, Noguera Ribagorzana, Cinca.

In Lleida
The river Segre is an essential feature of the Lleida's geography, dividing the city in two. During the city's history several floods have occurred, the last in the late 1970s. There is also a dam on the river, near the natural park La Mitjana. Another park, Els Camps Elisis, is adjacent to the Segre.

Many bridges span the river in the city of Lleida, namely: Pont Vell, Pont del Ferrocarril, Pont Nou, Pont de la Universitat, Pont de Pardinyes, Pont de Príncep de Viana, Passarel·la de Rufea, Passarel·la dels Maristes, Passarel·la d'Onze de Setembre, Passarel·la de Pardinyes and Passarel·la del Liceu Escolar.

See also 
 List of rivers of Spain
 List of rivers of Catalonia

References

External links

Environmental Action for River Segre -"La Mitjana", Lleida (Spain)

Rivers of Spain
Ebro basin
Rivers of Catalonia
Rivers of France
International rivers of Europe
Rivers of Aragon
Lleida
Rivers of Occitania (administrative region)
Rivers of Pyrénées-Orientales